Ograja (in older sources also Na Gradu or Nagrad,  or Suchenreuther) is a village in the Municipality of Kočevje in southern Slovenia. The area is part of the traditional region of Lower Carniola and is now included in the Southeast Slovenia Statistical Region. It no longer has any permanent residents.

History
Ograja was a Gottschee German village. The village was founded after 1498; in the land registry of 1574 it consisted of a full farm divided into two half-farms. Before the Second World War the village had nine houses. The original inhabitants were expelled in November 1941. Several of the houses then fell into ruin, but of the remaining five houses, three were still inhabited in 1971.

References

External links
Ograja on Geopedia
Pre–World War II list of oeconyms and family names in Ograja

Former populated places in the Municipality of Kočevje